The Arabian tahr (Arabitragus jayakari) is a species of tahr native to eastern Arabia. Until recently, it was placed in the genus Hemitragus, but genetic evidence supports its removal to a separate monotypic genus, Arabitragus.

The Arabian tahr is the smallest species of tahr. The animal is of stocky build with backward-arching horns in both sexes. Males are much more robust than females. Their coats consist of a long, reddish-brown hair, with a dark stripe running down the back. Males possess the most impressive manes which extend right down the back and grow longer, based on the age. In the oldest males the muzzle darkens to black and the eye stripes also darken. As with most mountain goats and sheep, they have rubber-like hooves to provide balance and traction on the steep, rocky slopes.

Habitat and range

It is also found in the area of Jebel Hafeet.

Taxonomy and etymology

The species was first described from specimens obtained by Dr. A.S.G. Jayakar from Jebel Taw and originally given the name Hemitragus jayakari. It was separated into the newly created genus Arabitragus on the basis of a study on the molecular phylogeny of the group in 2005.

The genus name Arabitragus is derived from the Greek words aravikós meaning "Arabian" and trágos meaning "goat".

Biology
Unlike other species of tahr, the Arabian tahr is solitary or lives in small groups consisting of a female and a kid, or a male. Instead of forming herds during seasonal ruts, reproduction occurs in small, dispersed family units. Births have been reported as occurring throughout the year, and gestation lasts from 140–145 days.

Diet and predation
These animals are usually browsers, feeding on grasses, shrubs, leaves, and fruits of most trees. They are highly dependent on water and need to drink every two to three days during summer. They descend from their point of elevation to drink from river courses known as wadis, and travel to new areas when water dries up.

The tahr was likely preyed upon by the Arabian leopard (Panthera pardus nimr) before the leopard's possible extirpation from the region in recent times.

Threats
The Arabian tahr is endangered due to intense overgrazing, poaching, and habitat destruction. In Oman, a recent increase of human migration to urban areas has resulted in domestic goats becoming feral and foraging in places that were once strictly the tahr's home. Habitat degradation is also another major threat, due to construction of roads, buildings, and mineral extraction. Also, poaching often occurs when the animals descend down from the mountains for water.

Conservation

In 1973, efforts were planned to protect the Arabian tahr, and in 1975, it was granted in the Hajar Mountains. In 1980, a captive-breeding program was set up at the Omani Mammal Breeding Center to reintroduce captive-bred individuals back into the wild. Three institutions are now involved, one in Oman and two in the United Arab Emirates, but many people seem to be unaware about the tahr's grave situations, leading to other conservation initiatives to focus on the publicity and educational campaigns to raise the animals' profile. In April 2009, the Wadi Wurayah preserve in the Emirate of Fujairah was set aside by royal decree in the Emirates for the protection of the tahr. Another place in the UAE, Sir Bani Yas in the Emirate of Abu Dhabi, was also set up for its conservation.

See also
 Himalayan tahr
 Nilgiri tahr
 Wildlife of Oman
 Wildlife of the United Arab Emirates

References

External links

Arabian Tahr in Oman
Arabian Tahr in United Arab Emirates
Arabian Tahr entry in ARKive

Caprids
Mammals of the Arabian Peninsula
Fauna of the Middle East
Mammals described in 1894
Taxa named by Oldfield Thomas